Murray Gordon Louis Balfour (August 24, 1936 — May 30, 1965) was a Canadian ice hockey right wing in the National Hockey League from 1956 to 1965, with the Montreal Canadiens, Chicago Black Hawks, and Boston Bruins. Balfour won the Stanley Cup in 1961 with Chicago. His career ended due to lung cancer, which led to his death in 1965.

Playing career
Balfour first played in the National Hockey League with the Montreal Canadiens, playing five games with them over the 1956–57 and 1957–58 seasons, though mainly spent those years with their minor-league affiliates, the Hull-Ottawa Canadiens and Montreal Royals. A right wing, Balfour was unable to play for Montreal full-time as the team already had Maurice Richard, Bernie Geoffrion, and Claude Provost on the team (the first two later being elected to the Hockey Hall of Fame. After spending the 1958–59 season with the minor-league Rochester Americans, Balfour was sold to the Chicago Black Hawks for cash.

Balfour was a member of the renowned "Million Dollar Line" alongside Bobby Hull and Bill Hay with the Black Hawks. In game three of the first round of the 1961 Stanley Cup playoffs, he scored the game winner in triple overtime against the defending champion Canadiens. In the fifth game, Balfour crashed into the Detroit Red Wings net and broke  his arm. The Hawks went on to win the Stanley Cup in six games with Balfour watching the final game from the hospital. He led Chicago in goals scored during the playoffs with 5. During the 1961–62 season Balfour re-injured his wrist, requiring surgery and an  steel rod implanted for support.

His play declined as a result of the injury, and he was traded to the Boston Bruins in 1964. He started the 1964–65 season with the Bruins, however complained about being tired and was slow, so was sent to their minor-league affiliate the Hershey Bears. After 31 games with Hershey Balforur stopped playing, and was treated for a lesion on his lung. On April 5 he had surgery, where an inoperable tumor was found.

He recorded 67 goals and 90 assists for a total of 157 points over his career, having played in 306 games.

Personal life
After the tumor was found on Balfour's lung, he returned home to Regina, and entered a hospital on May 29. He died of lung cancer on May 30, 1965.

The City of Regina named a hockey arena in Balfour's honour.

Balfour's parents were Gordon and Margaret Balfour of Regina.

Career statistics

Regular season and playoffs

See also
List of ice hockey players who died during their playing career

References

Bibliography

External links
 
Picture of Murray Balfour's Name on the 1961 Stanley Cup Plaque

1936 births
1965 deaths
Boston Bruins players
Canadian ice hockey right wingers
Chicago Blackhawks players
Deaths from lung cancer in Saskatchewan
Hershey Bears players
Hull-Ottawa Canadiens players
Ice hockey people from Saskatchewan
Montreal Canadiens players
Ontario Hockey Association Senior A League (1890–1979) players
Regina Pats players
Rochester Americans players
Sportspeople from Regina, Saskatchewan
Stanley Cup champions